Iveković is a Croatian surname. Etymologically it is derived from the name Ìvek, by means of possessive suffix -ov and patronymic-forming suffix -ić. The name Ivek is Kajkavian hypocoristic variety of the name Ìvan. It is chiefly distributed in the region of Zagorje.

It may refer to:

 Franjo Iveković (1834–1914), Croatian linguist and religious writer
 Mladen Iveković (1903–1970), Croatian politician
 Oton Iveković (1869–1939), Croatian painter
 Rada Iveković (born 1945), Croatian philosopher, Indologist, writer and a university professor
 Sanja Iveković (born 1949), Croatian artist

Croatian surnames